Hits 56 is a compilation album released in the UK in July 2003. It contains 40 tracks spread over two CDs, and features one number one single from Tomcraft.

It is the 56th volume in the Hits compilation album series. The album had a competition with Now 55, released the following week. Because of the week's difference, Hits 56 was able to enter the UK Compilations Chart at #1, whilst the following week Now 55 did the same. Hits 56 received a mixed reception.

The Westlife song "Tonight" previously appeared on Hits 55 as a radio remix courtesy of English production team METRO

Track listing

Disc one

Disc two

External links
 Track Listing at Amazon

2003 compilation albums
Hits (compilation series) albums